Liam McGrath (born 1974) is an Irish hurler who played as a half forward for the Tipperary senior team.

McGrath joined the team during the 1994 championship and was a regular member of the team for five seasons. During that time he won one National Hurling League winners' medal.

At club level McGrath plays with the Burgess club.

References

1974 births
Living people
Burgess hurlers
Tipperary inter-county hurlers